Coldstream is a village in Sarah Baartman District Municipality in the Eastern Cape province of South Africa.

The village lies east of Plettenberg Bay on the Tsitsikamma coast. The area is famous for a burial stone excavated here in 1910, depicting a prehistoric artist holding brush-feather and palette, indicating that rock paintings were being executed in South Africa some 2,000 years ago. Said to be named after a cold stream flowing past.

References

Populated places in the Kou-Kamma Local Municipality